Stoneman's raid was a cavalry operation led by General George Stoneman during the Chancellorsville Campaign that preceded the start of the Battle of Chancellorsville in the American Civil War.

Strategy

In April 1863, Major General Joseph Hooker put his army in motion to force Lee out of his Fredericksburg positions. He sent Major General George Stoneman's 10,000-strong cavalry to move between Lee and the Confederate capital, Richmond. Hooker expected Stoneman to sever Lee's line of supply by destroying the strategically vital Orange and Alexandria Railroad at the town of Gordonsville. This would, Hooker hoped, compel Lee to withdraw from Fredericksburg while cutting him off from supplies and transportation. Hooker also saw to it that John Buford was given an active field command and rode to battle in April 1863 with the Reserve Brigade, an organization that contained the majority of the Regular Army cavalry units serving in the east.

On April 12, Hooker wrote to Stoneman of the impending operation:

Prelude

At 8 a.m. on April 13, 1863, Buford's Brigade, composed of the First, Second, Fifth, and Sixth U.S. Cavalry, left camp at Falmouth, Virginia, to embark on the ambitious and daring raid. As soon as the next day, they were engaged with the enemy at Kelly's Ford; the rebels firing upon the brigade with two 10-pounder Parrotts - 13 shots in total. Lieutenant Elder's four-gun battery replied, firing 12 shots, and drove the rebel guns out of sight. According to Buford's official report, by the 15th, the brigade was at Rappahannock Bridge, ready to cross but were ordered to await further instructions. However, nature had not dealt a kind hand to the Union cavalry as torrential rain turned the roads to quagmires and the streams into raging torrents. It was not until April 29 that the Reserve Brigade was able to cross at Kelly's Ford.

Over those intervening two weeks, Buford detailed the conditions facing the cavalry;

Stoneman's Raid

During April 29 and 30, elements of Buford's cavalry scoured the countryside seeking suitable river crossings and skirmishing with Rebel pickets. The conditions and the weather deteriorated with the men's rations becoming sodden and since campfires were forbidden lest they reveal the raider's location, the cavalryman's uniforms were rarely dry. The plight of the horses was even worse; dead and crippled animals marked the route of Stoneman's march. By May 2, Buford's brigade camped alone on the south bank of the North Anna river—he had led his men almost halfway to the Confederate capital at Richmond and could begin his task of destroying the local infrastructure in earnest.

On May 2 Captain Myles Keogh accompanied British born Lieutenant Walker's C Company, Fifth U.S cavalry, in a raid that captured a 15 wagon strong supply train at Thompson's Cross Roads. Keogh personally arranged for the captured mules, 60 in all, to be distributed to the men whose horses had gone lame. At Louisa, Captain Lord, with his regiment, the First Cavalry, was also detached toward Tolersville and Frederickshall, to destroy the railroad and to burn the bridge over the North Anna, on the road from Fredericksburg.

On May 4, a Captain Harrison with the remainder of the Fifth U.S. cavalry engaged Confederate cavalry for the first time in the raid, led by Robert E. Lee's son, Rooney Lee. In his own report of that event, Captain James E. Harrison gives his account of facing a force vastly superior in number to his own:

By May 5, only 646 of the brigade's horses were deemed fit to continue. Using these mounts, Buford, by necessity, returned to Louisa and Gordonsville only to find their destructive work of three days previous partly repaired. Buford's men set about their destructive task again. There at nightfall they met and evaded a strong contingent of Confederate infantry and cannon, although briefly, one trooper admitted, "it looked...as if our time had come."

Buford's return towards Gordonsville was also ordered as a ruse to mask the return of the main body of Stoneman's cavalry to Hooker's command. Colonel George B. Sandford would later write: "Buford was the man of all others to be entrusted with such an undertaking." For three days and nights, Buford's exhausted men remained on the move and such was the trooper's fatigue that dozens of men fell asleep in the saddles of their emaciated, sore backed horses. Even now, as the mission was nearing completion, ended by the Union retreat from its defeat at Chancellorsville, Buford's column was still battling the swollen rivers and streams.

From May 6, when they regrouped with Stoneman, to the 10th, Buford's men made their way slowly back to HQ at Falmouth where they returned to picket duty and recovered from the previous weeks exertions. Buford's enterprise provided one of the few bright moments in what was a less damaging campaign than expected, although the Northern press hailed the incursion in glowing terms.

Postscript
During the Chancellorsville Campaign, Stoneman accomplished little and Hooker considered him one of the principal reasons for the Union defeat at Chancellorsville. Hooker needed to deflect criticism from himself and relieved Stoneman from his cavalry command, sending him back to Washington, D.C., for medical treatment (chronic hemorrhoids, exacerbated by cavalry service), where in July he became a Chief of the U.S. Cavalry Bureau, a desk job.

Buford was soon elevated to the command of a cavalry division but was quick to laud the performances of his seven staff in his official report of the raid:

Regardless of the success or failure of the daring operation, what it did install was a growing sense of confidence among the men of the Federal cavalry. While Captain Merritt of the 1st Maine may be slightly overstating the legacy of that campaign when he termed it—"one of the most remarkable achievements in the history of modern warfare"—one of his troopers probably best summed up the new-found confidence when he recorded:

See also

References
 General
 
 U.S. War Department, The War of the Rebellion: a Compilation of the Official Records of the Union and Confederate Armies, U.S. Government Printing Office, 1880–1901.
 Sears, Stephen W., Chancellorsville, Houghton Mifflin, 1996, .
 Myles Keogh: The Life and Legend of an "Irish Dragoon" in the Seventh Cavalry, John P. Langellier, Kurt Hamilton Cox, Brian C. Pohanka, 1998, 

 Specific

External links 
  Official Civil War Records
 Stoneman's 1865 Raid

Chancellorsville Campaign
Battles of the Eastern Theater of the American Civil War
Confederate victories of the American Civil War
Cavalry raids of the American Civil War
Spotsylvania County in the American Civil War
Conflicts in 1863
1863 in Virginia
Military operations of the American Civil War in Virginia
April 1863 events
May 1863 events